is a horizontally scrolling shooter by SNK released as an arcade video game in 1992. It was also released for the Neo-Geo and Neo Geo CD systems, SNK Arcade Classics Vol. 1 for the PlayStation 2, PlayStation Portable, and Wii, as well as ACA Neo-Geo for the PlayStation 4 and Xbox One.

Gameplay 

The object of the game is to fight through five stages (twice) and destroy the end stage bosses by aiming for their weak points. The player maneuvers both a cyber jet and (once procured) an indestructible robot drone which acts both as a shield against small projectiles (similar to the Dino 246 drone in Pulstar and Blazing Star) and an additional weapon with multi-directional fire and concussion launch capabilities. The robot drone can be toggled to a stoptrack position or to rotate around the cyber jet. The cyber jet can be upgraded with three levels of three types of firepower and faster jet speed by collecting the corresponding power-ups.

Plot 
Many years in the future, mankind has developed the technology for space colonization. However, a mysterious computer virus infects the primary computer running man's first space station, causing it not only to affect its automated defenses, but to convince other humans to side with it. The computer attacks Earth so often that Earth's only hope is put into advanced spaceships wielding great firepower.

Development 

Last Resort was developed by former Irem staff members.

Reception 

Last Resort garnered positive reception from seven reviewers of Gamest during its 1992 AOU Show appearance. In Japan, Game Machine listed the game on their May 15, 1992 issue as being the thirteenth most popular arcade software at the time. RePlay also reported the game to be the sixteenth most-popular arcade game at the time. The title received generally positive reception from critics since its release in arcades and other platforms, with some comparing it with R-Type. Other reviewers also drew visual comparison with the 1988 film Akira.

Consoles Pluss Marc Menier and Douglas of Consoles Plus praised the visual presentation, sound design, playability and longevity, regarding it as a referencial shoot 'em up for Neo Geo. Electronic Gaming Monthlys four reviewers panned the Neo Geo AES version, commenting that it has impressive graphics and sounds but crippling slowdown and extremely short length, problems they found especially unforgivable given the console's powerful hardware and the cartridge's high price. Hobby Consolas Marcos García highly commended the graphics, music and two-player mode but criticized the lack of an additional stage and occasional slowdown during gameplay. Joypads Jean-François Morisse and Joysticks Jean-Marc Demoly gave positive remarks to the graphics, sprite animations, sound and controls.

Player Ones Cyril Drevet stated that the power-up system was a mixture of R-Type and Forgotten Worlds and criticized the occurrence of slowdown during gameplay, comparing it with those of popular shoot 'em ups on the Super NES. However, Drevet nevertheless praised the visuals, sound, difficulty and longevity. Consolemania Davide Corrado commended the graphics, sound and playability but criticized its high difficulty level. Power Plays Martin Gaksch regarded it as the best classic-style shooter since R-Type and its sequel for arcades and consoles, praising the title's ingenuity, audiovisual presentation, and action.

Ultimate Future Games reviewed the Neo Geo CD version and praised the graphically detailed sprites and stages, opera-style rave soundtrack, sound effects and action but criticized its short length. VideoGames & Computer Entertainments Andy Eddy criticized the occurrence of slowdown and flickering, short length and difficulty. Nintendo Lifes Damien McFerran compared its dark atmosphere with both R-Type and Armed Police Unit Gallop, praising its soundtrack and challenge, regarding it as one of the best shooters on Neo Geo but criticized the two-player mode for being broken and other aspects. In 2014, HobbyConsolas identified it as one of the twenty best games for the Neo Geo CD. Likewise, Time Extension also listed it as one of the best games for the Neo Geo.

Notes

References

External links 
 Last Resort at GameFAQs
 Last Resort at Giant Bomb
 Last Resort at Killer List of Videogames
 Last Resort at MobyGames

1992 video games
ACA Neo Geo games
Arcade video games
Cooperative video games
D4 Enterprise games
Horizontally scrolling shooters
Neo Geo games
Neo Geo CD games
Nintendo Switch games
PlayStation Network games
PlayStation 4 games
SNK games
SNK Playmore games
Video games set in the future
Virtual Console games
Xbox One games
Science fiction video games
Video games developed in Japan
Hamster Corporation games